Kirstin is a given name. Notable people with the name include:

Kirstin Maldonado (born 1992), American singer and Member of Pentatonix
Kirstin Cole, currently the consumer reporter for WCBS-TV (CBS 2) in New York City
Kirstin Gove (born 1973), former Scottish broadcast journalist and presenter
Kirstin Jean Lewis (born 1975), South African archer
Kirstin Lawton (born 1980), British trampolinist
Kirstin Marcon, New Zealand Screenwriter and Film Director
Kirstin Matthews, Fellow in Science and Technology Policy at the James A. Baker III Institute for Public Policy
Kirstin Normand (born 1974), Canadian competitor in synchronized swimming and Olympic medalist

See also
Kirsteen, given name
Kirstine, given name
Kartanonherra ja kaunis Kirstin (Finnish: The Lord of the Mansion and the Beautiful Kirstin), a historical novel by Finnish author Kaari Utrio

English feminine given names